Laja is a city and commune located in the Bío Bío Province of the Bío Bío Region of Chile. The city of Laja is the communal capital.

Geography
It is bounded on the north by the Laja River, on the west by the Biobío river, and the south and the east by the commune of Los Ángeles.

Demographics
Of these, 16,288 (72.7%) lived in urban areas and 6,116 (27.3%) in rural areas. The population fell by 8% (1946 persons) between the 1992 and 2002 censuses.

Within the commune's territory are: Laja, its capital city; the villages of Las Ciénagas, Villa Laja and Las Playas; and the small villages of Puente Perales, Cantera, Violeta Parra, Cachapoal, La Colonia, Las Ciénagas, Diuquín, Picul, Santiago Chico, Quilales, Chillancito, Las Viñas, Las Lomas, Santa Elena, La Aguada and Arenas Muertas.

Administration
As a commune, Laja is a third-level administrative division of Chile administered by a municipal council, headed by an alcalde who is directly elected every four years. The 2008-2012 alcalde is Vladimir Fica Toledo (ILE).

Within the electoral divisions of Chile, Laja is represented in the Chamber of Deputies by Juan Lobos (UDI) and José Pérez (PRSD) as part of the 47th electoral district, together with Los Ángeles, Tucapel, Antuco, Quilleco, Santa Bárbara, Quilaco, Mulchén, Negrete, Nacimiento, San Rosendo and Alto Bío Bío. The commune is represented in the Senate by Victor Pérez Varela (UDI) and Mariano Ruiz-Esquide Jara (PDC) as part of the 13th senatorial constituency (Biobío-Coast).

References

External links
  Municipality of Laja

Communes of Chile
Populated places in Bío Bío Province
1891 establishments in Chile